Sotirios Vatanidis (born 1914, date of death unknown) was a Greek wrestler. He competed in the men's Greco-Roman lightweight at the 1936 Summer Olympics.

References

External links
 

1914 births
Year of death missing
Place of birth missing
Greek male sport wrestlers
Olympic wrestlers of Greece
Wrestlers at the 1936 Summer Olympics
20th-century Greek people